Emily Bett Rickards (born July 24, 1991) is a Canadian actress. She is known for her role as Felicity Smoak on The CW series Arrow, her first television credit. She has also reprised the role in the Arrowverse shows The Flash, Legends of Tomorrow and Supergirl and voiced the character on the animated web series Vixen.

Early life and career
Rickards was born and raised in British Columbia. Her mother is Dr. Diane Greig, a dream psychotherapist in Vancouver.

Beginning on her career path at a young age, she introduced herself to musical theatre and dance, with the hope of later introducing herself to more serious acting. She graduated from high school early and attended the Vancouver Film School, completing the Acting Essentials Program. After completing the program, she attended an open call audition, which gained her an agent. She studied at the Alida Vocal Studio in Vancouver. Rickards made her first professional appearance in 2009, starring in the video for the Nickelback single "Never Gonna Be Alone".

Career

Arrowverse
Rickards breakthrough role came in 2012 with her first television casting, as Felicity Smoak in the CW television series Arrow, which is based on the DC Comics character Green Arrow. Originally signed as a one-episode guest star, positive reaction from her co-star, show-lead Stephen Amell, and from Warner Brothers executive Peter Roth as well as from journalists at preview screenings, led to Rickards being signed as a recurring star for the rest of the show's first season. The success of the character saw her signed as a series regular from the second season onwards. Speaking in 2013 about that decision, Arrow Executive Producer Marc Guggenheim stated "we were very lucky that we cast Emily Rickards, who just lit up the screen." In March 2019, Rickards announced that she would be leaving Arrow at the end of the show's seventh season. In November 2019 Rickards was confirmed as a guest star for Arrows series finale.

Throughout the series run, Rickards received praise for her performance in the role, often described as the show's "fan favourite" or "breakout" character, with many critics describing the character, and Rickards, as an integral part of the show's success. Notably her delivery of the monologue in the season six episode "We Fall" won her particular praise. Rickards was nominated for multiple Teen Choice and Leo Awards for the role, and in 2016, her portrayal of the character was placed at number 15 in a list of 50 Favourite Female Characters, in a poll of Hollywood professionals conducted by The Hollywood Reporter.

Rickards also portrayed the character in the spin-off shows to the series (collectively known as the Arrowverse) The Flash, Legends of Tomorrow and Supergirl, as well as providing the voice for the character on animated show Vixen. In 2013, she portrayed Felicity in web-based promotional tie-in series Blood Rush, sponsored by Bose, which also featured the characters of Roy Harper (Colton Haynes) and Quentin Lance (Paul Blackthorne).

Film work
In early 2012 Rickards filmed a minor role in the film Random Acts of Romance, starring Amanda Tapping and in May filmed a minor role in Flicka: Country Pride, which starred her future Arrow castmate Kacey Rohl. In November she was cast in the Lifetime television movie Romeo Killer: The Chris Porco Story, starring Eric McCormack and Matt Barr, which was filmed in early 2013. A fictionalized account of the murder and attempted murder of Peter and Joan Porco, respectively, Rickards played the role of Lauren Philips, a fictionalized love-interest of the killer, Chris Porco.

In March 2014, Rickards was cast in the sequel to Cowgirls 'n Angels, entitled Cowgirls 'n Angels: Dakota's Summer, as Kristen Rose, the sister of the film's protagonist, Dakota, portrayed by Haley Ramm. The film premiered at the 2014 Dallas International Film Festival.

2015 saw Rickards in a supporting role in the Oscar nominated film Brooklyn. Rickards auditioned for the role with director John Crowley via a Skype call from her agent's office. Her scenes were filmed in Montreal, and when speaking about the filming experience, she noted "Everyone was so artistic and so meticulous about being respectful of the era and the story, that I'm not surprised with the turnout of how beautiful and well crafted the film is".

Rickards was cast in the movie Slumber in 2016, alongside Darby Stanchfield and Meaghan Rath. Filming took place in Los Angeles in May 2016.  In the same year she was cast in Aisha Tyler's feature film directorial debut, Axis. The film premiered at the 2017 Sarasota Film Festival and went on win the prize for Outstanding Achievement in Filmmaking (Feature Film) at the 2017 Newport Beach Film Festival. 2016 also saw Rickards co-starring, alongside Josh Dallas and Tom Cavanagh in the super-hero themed short film Sidekick, directed by Arrowverse alum Jeff Cassidy. Cassidy was keen for Rickards to take the role of Emma/The Princess, but was initially concerned she looked too young for the role of "rundown, blue collar, life's been beaten out of her, mother". However, following consultation with make-up artist Tina Teoli, he was convinced that they could age her appropriately for the role.

In 2017 she starred alongside Jana Winternitz and Matthew Glave in the Michael Gallagher directed comedy film Funny Story.  filmed over fifteen days in Los Angeles, and on location at Topanga Canyon and Big Sur. The film premiered at the Slamdance Film Festival in January 2018, where it was runner-up in the festival's 'Beyond' programme. Speaking about casting the role, director Gallagher stated: "We needed an actress who could speak volumes without saying a word. The kind of actor whose heart shines through their eyes. Emily Bett Rickards has these qualities." Rickards performance as Kim received particular praise from festival critics described as "impressively toe(ing) the line between blustery self-regard and the vulnerability it hides", "exploring a broad spectrum of emotions" and being able to " in on the inherent conflict within Kimberly". The film went on to win the Stolman Audience Award for Best American Indie at the 2018 Sonoma International Film Festival and in the same year won the Audience Award for Best Narrative Feature at the Vero Beach Wine and Film Festival, Best Feature Film at the Santorini Film Festival and the Grand Jury prize at the Barcelona Film Festival. The film premiered in the UK in October 2018, at the Southampton International Film Festival, where Rickards was nominated in the Leading Actress in A Feature category. The film premiered on a limited theatrical release on May 24, 2019 and became available for digital downward from the same date.

In May 2019, Rickards joined the cast of independent movie We Need to Talk, co-starring James Maslow, and written and directed by Todd Wolfe. The production was filmed in the Greater Philadelphia area, and filming took place over a month-long period in June and July of the same year. The film premiered as an official selection at the FirstGlance Film Festival in Philadelphia, in November 2020 where Rickards won the Best Actress (Feature Film) Award.

Stage and other work
In early 2016, Rickards filmed the role of narrator Genevieve Kreme for the Canadian web-series Paranormal Solutions, which was launched online in April of the same year. In June, she appeared in an episode of the fifth season of IFC comedy Comedy Bang! Bang!.

In May 2018 Rickards announced she would be playing the lead role in a production of Zayd Dohrn's Reborning for Reality Curve Theatre Group, at the Annex Theatre in Vancouver. The production premiered on June 20, 2018. The play was well-received, with Katie Gartlan-Close, of Vancouver Presents, describing Rickards as doing "a phenomenal job carrying this show" giving a "nuanced portrayal of Kelly" and Jerry Wasserman of the Vancouver Sun commenting "Rickards gives us a painfully powerful Kelly" and that "her physical and emotional descent into madness is impressive". In April 2019, Rickards announced she would be reprising the role of Kelly, alongside castmates Lori Triolo and Paul Piaskowski, in Reality Curve's off-Broadway production of Reborning at New York's SoHo Playhouse, in July and August of the same year. Rickards performance in the production was well-received, with Ken Kaissar of Theatre Is Easy, describing her as "incredibly captivating" and praising her chemistry with Piaskowski, whilst Laura Collins-Hughes of The New York Times praised her performance for making the character "almost feral" in her emotional descent.

In September 2018 an audiobook of The Wicked Ones, a story written by Cassandra Clare and Robin Wasserman and originally published as part of the Ghosts of the Shadow Market anthology, a companion book to Clare's The Mortal Instruments series, was released by Simon and Schuster for digital download, narrated by Rickards.

Philanthropy
In 2016, Rickards launched a T-shirt campaign in support of the American Autoimmune Related Diseases Association (AARDA) through the crowd funding merchandise site Represent.com, with all proceeds going to the charity.

During season four of Arrow, Rickards character Felicity Smoak is paralyzed from the waist down following a shooting incident, and later regains the ability to walk through the use of a prototype microchip, in the episode "Taken". Rickards filmed a Public Service Announcement in conjunction with the Christopher and Dana Reeve Foundation advocating for advancements in the treatment of spinal injuries, released on the air date of the episode.

In February 2019, Vancouver Film School announced the "Emily Bett Rickards Acting Scholarship", a partnership between the school and Rickards, to fund a full scholarship for both of the school's acting programmes, as well as additional partial funding of $250,000 for other students. Rickards will also select the recipients.

Filmography

Film

Television

Web

Music video

Stage

Discography

Awards and nominations

Film

Television

References

External links

1991 births
21st-century Canadian actresses
Actresses from Vancouver
Canadian film actresses
Canadian television actresses
Canadian voice actresses
Living people